The following is a list of spa towns in Greece.

Aidipsos, Euboea 
Agkistro, Serres
Kaiafa
Kamena Vourla
Kimolos
Krinides, Kavala
Lakkos of Milos island
Loutraki
Loutra Lagkadas
Loutra Kyllinis
Loutra, Kythnos island
Loutra, Nisyros island
Loutra Ypatis
Loutrochori, Aridaia, Pella (Pozar)
Methana
Nea Apollonia
Platistomo of Makrakomi
Polichnito of Lesbos island
Sidirokastro, Serres       
Smokovo
Therma, Ikaria island
Thermopylae
Thermi, Thessaloniki

See also 
 List of spa towns

 
Towns (spa)
Greece